White Hill is a hill in the Forest of Bowland, north-western England. It lies between Slaidburn and High Bentham. The summit houses a tower and a trig point. In medieval times, the hill marked one of the northernmost limits of the Lordship of Bowland.

Marilyns of England
Hills of the Forest of Bowland
Geography of Ribble Valley
Geography of the City of Lancaster
Mountains and hills of Lancashire